Burning in Water, Drowning in Flame may refer to:

 Burning in Water, Drowning in Flame (album), a 1992 album by Skrew
 "Burning in Water, Drowning in Flame" (Fear the Walking Dead), an episode of the television series Fear the Walking Dead